Big Boy is a 1930 American Pre-Code musical comedy film produced by Warner Bros. The film was directed by Alan Crosland and stars Al Jolson, Claudia Dell, Louise Closser Hale, and Noah Beery. The film is based on the 1925 Broadway hit show of the same name in which Jolson also starred.

Synopsis
Gus (Al Jolson) is a loyal stable boy and jockey for a rich family in the South that has been interested in horse racing and breeding horses for generations. (In a flashback to 1870, we see Gus's grandfather working for the same family.) The young heir of the family, Jack, loses a lot of money by gambling and is blackmailed by his creditors for forging a check. They persuade Jack to ask his mother to replace Gus with another jockey for the family's racehorse, Big Boy, but she refuses. They frame Gus for tampering with the horse and he is discharged, replaced by a jockey who has been bought off to lose on purpose. Gus finds work as a waiter in a fancy restaurant, where he uncovers the details about the race throwing plot. With Jack's help, he outsmarts the crooks just in time to ride Big Boy to victory.

Cast
Al Jolson as Gus 
Claudia Dell as Annabel
Louise Closser Hale as Mother
Lloyd Hughes as Jack
Eddie Phillips as Coley Reed 
Noah Beery as Bagby

Songs
"Little Sunshine"
"Tomorrow Is Another Day"
"Liza Lee"
"Hooray for Baby and Me"

Box office
According to Warner Bros records the film earned $437,000 domestically and $61,000 foreign.

Preservation
Because of the public apathy to musicals at the time of its release, some of the musical sequences were cut from the picture before release and it was advertised strictly as a comedy picture. This domestic release print survives complete and has been released by Warner Archive on DVD. The film may have been released in a longer version outside the United States where there was never any backlash against musicals. It is unknown whether a copy of this full musical version still exists.

References

 Richard Barrios, A Song in the Dark (Oxford University Press, 1995)

External links
 1893-1993
 
 
 

1930 films
American musical comedy films
American black-and-white films
Films based on musicals
Films directed by Alan Crosland
American horse racing films
Warner Bros. films
Kentucky Derby
1930 musical comedy films
1930s English-language films
1930s American films